Protein GPR107 is a protein that in humans is encoded by the GPR107 gene.

References

Further reading